Batak Municipality is a municipality in the Pazardzhik Province of Bulgaria.

Demography

At the 2011 census, the population of Batak was 6,144. Most of the inhabitants (53.46%) were Bulgarians, and there were significant minorities of Gypsies/Romani (3.43%) and Turks (38.34%). 4.6% of the population's ethnicity was unknown.

Communities

Towns
 Batak

Villages
 Fotinovo
 Nova Mahala

References

Municipalities in Pazardzhik Province